Sitalkuchi  Assembly constituency is an assembly constituency in Cooch Behar district in the Indian state of West Bengal. It is reserved for scheduled castes.

Overview
As per orders of the Delimitation Commission, No. 5 Sitalkuchi Assembly constituency (SC) covers Sitalkuchi community development block and Bairagirhat, Gopalpur, Jorpatiki, Kedarhat, Kursamari, Nayarhat and Shikarpur gram panchayats of Mathabhanga I community development block.

Sitalkuchi Assembly constituency is part of No. 1  Cooch Behar (Lok Sabha constituency) (SC).

Members of Legislative Assembly
From 1967 to 1977 there was no seat at Sitalkuchi.

Election results

2021
In the 2021 elections Baren Chandra Barman of Bharatiya Janata Party won defeating his nearest rival Partha Pratim R0y of All India Trinamool Congress

|-
! style="background-color:#E9E9E9;text-align:left;" width=225|Party
! style="background-color:#E9E9E9;text-align:right;" |Seats won
! style="background-color:#E9E9E9;text-align:right;" |Seat change
|-
| style="text-align:left;" |Bharatiya Janata Party
| style="text-align:center;" | 7
| style="text-align:center;" | 7
|-
| style="text-align:left;" |Trinamool Congress
| style="text-align:center;" | 2
| style="text-align:center;" | 6
|-
| style="text-align:left;" |Left Front
| style="text-align:center;" | 0
| style="text-align:center;" | 1
|-
|}

2016
In the 2016 election, Hiten Barman of Trinamool Congress defeated his nearest rival Namadipti Adhikary of CPI(M).

 

|-
! style="background-color:#E9E9E9;text-align:left;" width=225|Party
! style="background-color:#E9E9E9;text-align:right;" |Seats won
! style="background-color:#E9E9E9;text-align:right;" |Seat change
|-
| style="text-align:left;" |Trinamool Congress
| style="text-align:center;" | 8
| style="text-align:center;" | 4
|-
| style="text-align:left;" |Left Front
| style="text-align:center;" | 1
| style="text-align:center;" | 3
|-
| style="text-align:left;" |Indian National Congress
| style="text-align:center;" | 0
| style="text-align:center;" | 1
|-
|-
|}

2011
In the 2011 election, Hiten Barman of Trinamool Congress defeated his nearest rival Biswanath Pramanik of CPI(M).

1977-2006
In the 2006 state assembly elections, Harish Chandra Barman of CPI(M) won the Sitalkuchi seat defeating his nearest rival Lalit Chandra Pramanik of Trinamool Congress. Contests in most years were multi cornered but only winners and runners are being mentioned. Sudhir Pramanik of CPI(M) defeated Birendra Narayan Barma of Congress in 2001 and 1996, Ambika Charan Ray of Congress in 1991, Sabita Roy of Congress in 1987, and Birendranath Roy of Congress in 1982 and 1977.

Earlier
Bejoy Kumar Roy of Forward Bloc won the Sitalkuchi seat in 1962.

References

Politics of Cooch Behar district
Assembly constituencies of West Bengal